Events in the year 1819 in Brazil.

Incumbents
 Monarch – King John VI of Portugal

Events

Births

Deaths

References

 
1810s in Brazil
Years of the 19th century in Brazil
Brazil
Brazil